In the 1966 Canadian National Challenge Cup, the CSA used a provincial all-star team format.

Teams/Rosters
 B.C. (Squad)
 Bruce Ballam (UBC Thunderbirds)
 Jim Berry (UBC Thunderbirds)
 Russ Hillman (UBC Thunderbirds)
 Kirby Carter (UBC Thunderbirds)
 Allan McLeod (Burnaby)
 Harold Hansen (Burnaby)
 Gary Thompson (Burnaby)
 Silvano Lenarduzzi (Columbus)
 Sergio Zanatta (Columbus)
 Enzo Bennato (Columbus)
 Neil Ellett (North Shore)
 Colin Atkinson (North Shore)
 Ralph Burkinshaw (St. Andrews)
 Dennis Irwin (St. Andrews)
 Ike MacKay (Victoria United)
 Robert Goodheart (New Westminster Royals)
 Quebec: Peter Greco (Superga)
 Sonny Taylor (St. Paul)
 Armand Schultz (Kickers)
 Bob Campbell (Hearts)
 Joe Di Iola (Superga)
 Yehudi Nacson (Hakoah)
 Lucio Pietrocupa (Kalena)
 Jack Boss (Hakoah)
 Sirio Socetti (S.O.Y. Inter)
 Richard Haxby (Hearts)
 Colin Webb (St. Paul)
 Norman Patterson (St. Paul)
 Luigi Pizzolitto (Superga)
 Danry Sopata (Hearts)
 Tommy Hughes (St. Paul)
 Sean Magill (Verdun Celtic)

1966
Canadian National Challenge Cup
Nat